The Eastern Zone was one of the three regional zones of the 1963 Davis Cup.

9 teams entered the Eastern Zone, with the winner going on to compete in the Inter-Zonal Zone against the winners of the America Zone and Europe Zone. India defeated Japan in the final and progressed to the Inter-Zonal Zone.

Draw

First round

Ceylon vs. Pakistan

Quarterfinals

India vs. Pakistan

Malaya vs. Burma

Japan vs. South Korea

Philippines vs. New Zealand

Semifinals

Malaya vs. India

Japan vs. Philippines

Final

Japan vs. India

References

External links
Davis Cup official website

Davis Cup Asia/Oceania Zone
Eastern Zone
Davis Cup